Cabanis's bunting (Emberiza cabanisi) is a species of bird in the family Emberizidae.

It is found across most of sub-Saharan Africa in its natural habitats of subtropical or tropical dry forests and dry savannah.

The common name and Latin binomial commemorate the German ornithologist Jean Louis Cabanis.

References

External links
 Cabanis's bunting - Species text in The Atlas of Southern African Birds.

Cabanis's bunting
Birds of Sub-Saharan Africa
Cabanis's bunting
Taxonomy articles created by Polbot
Taxa named by Anton Reichenow